"Do It Again" is the second single from Swami's forthcoming album, Upgrade in Progress.  Written by Diamond Duggal, S-Endz, Liana McCarthy, Supreet Suri and Arshad Khan, it was released on 7 November 2014.

The song features vocals by band members S-Endz, Sups and Liana and was produced by DJ Swami. The song is a fusion of electro, bhangra and pop music.

Music video
A video for this song was filmed in India in September 2014 and was released on 7 November 2014 along with the single.

References

2014 singles
2014 songs